Jaya Janaki Nayaka is a 2017 Indian Telugu-language action drama film directed by Boyapati Srinu and produced by Miryala Ravinder Reddy, under Dwaraka Creations. It stars Bellamkonda Sreenivas, Rakul Preet Singh and Jagapathi Babu, while Sarath Kumar, Suman and Tarun Arora play other pivotal roles. Pragya Jaiswal appears in an extended cameo appearance. The music was composed by Devi Sri Prasad. The film was released on 11 August 2017 and garnered mixed reviews from critics and audience.

Plot
  
Sweety is a college-going student, who meets his co-student Gagan when he saves her friend from being harassed by Vikram Verma, the son of the Central Minister who makes it a point to take down Gagan and his family. Gagan lives with his businessman father Chakravarthy and brother Pruthvi. The trio enjoys their life from drinking alcohol to eating roadside foods and beating up wrongdoers in society. Sweety gets attracted to Gagan and start to hang out, and she comes to house and makes a change in their lifestyle for their own sake, for which Chakravarthy happily agrees. Sweety learns about Pruthvi's love failure and ends up reconciling with the would-be bride's parents, and the marriage is conducted in a grand manner. Chakravarthy, upon seeing the happiness and joy in the atmosphere,  realizes that Sweety is the reason behind everything and asks Gagan to always be by her side.

Meanwhile, Ashwith Narayana Varma is a prestige-driven corporate businessman, who kills his daughter's would-be groom in an accident. When the groom finds a video of Narayana's daughter romancing another guy that she liked before the engagement. He leaves a gun on the table, and forces his daughter to kill herself, to which she does. Narayana's company plan to build a highway that would make his company as the most successful company, but his son Veerendra reveals that the project has competition in the form of Arjun Pawar, who is the biggest liquor baron in North India. Arjun is supported by his two brothers and has bought off all of Narayana's close associates and subordinates except for JP, who is the Highway authority director. Arjun threatens JP, stating that if he does not agree to his terms, that he would kill his daughter. JP agrees out of fear. However, Narayana retaliates and sends Veerendra where he kills Arjun's brother.

Sweety realizes that she is truly in love with Gagan and expresses her feelings towards him. Gagan is delighted, and they leave for Sweety's house to meet  her father, who is JP. JP insults Gagan, after realizing his lifestyle and the reputation that Chakravarthy has in society, then proceeds to insult Sweety. Enraged, Gagan slaps JP, but Sweety, who cares for her father's life more than anything sends Gagan away and tells him to never come back. 

Heartbroken, Gagan drives and tries to forget Sweety, where he gets into a car accident. Fearing for his life, Chakravarthy and his uncle sends him away with known relatives in Vizag. Gagan's uncle's daughter Falguni arrives at the airport and Gagan realizes that her lifestyle is young, wild, and free. Falguni, however, has no interest in Gagan. While driving back after a party on the beach, Gagan witnesses Narayana's family being attacked by Arjun's brother where he proceed to save them. Narayana's family pleads with Gagan to save them and their daughter-in-law. Gagan saves the daughter-in-law, who happens to be Sweety. Shocked, Gagan is then shot and left for dead. However, Gagan survives with Narayana's help. Narayana's wife reveals that Narayana and JP decide to get Veerendra married to Sweety. At the wedding, Veerendra is shot and killed by Arjun's men and kidnap everyone to kill them. Since Veerendra died at the hands of Arjun, JP has no choice, but to let Sweety away from the Narayana family. However, Narayana's sister calls Narayana and tells him that they need Sweety, since she is almost married to Veerendra and decided to adopt Sweety as their daughter-in-law. Since her would-be husband is dead, Sweety becomes a poor widow with no family emotions.

Gagan then vows to protect Sweety. Narayana's sister arrives and tells that the family must perform a ritual at the Hamsala Devi river area. However, in reality has made a deal with Arjun to get Sweety and leave her family alone. As Narayana and the rest of his family perform the pooja, they are attacked by Arjun's men. As they are about to attack Sweety, Gagan arrives along with Chakravarthy and Pruthvi and kills everyone. He takes Sweety along with him, and Narayana feels that his prestige has once again been damaged. Mahendra Varma enrages both Narayana and Arjun on Gagan, so they both join hands with each other in eliminating Gagan once and for all. In the attack, Chakravarthy and Pruthvi are seriously injured, and Narayana kidnaps Sweety. Gagan arrives at the hideout where Sweety is being kept and kills everyone, except Narayana. Gagan tells that Narayana lost his prestige when he joined hands with Arjun, who killed Veerendra just to kill Sweety. As Narayana is listening to this, he shoots himself and dies. Thus, Gagan reunites with Sweety.

Cast 

Bellamkonda Sreenivas as Gagan Chakravarthy, Sweety's love interest
Rakul Preet Singh as Sweety/ Janaki, Gagan's love interest and JP's daughter
Jagapathi Babu as Aswith Narayana Varma
Sarath Kumar as Chakravarthy, Gagan's father
Suman as Central Minister
Tarun Arora as Arjun Pawar
Nandu as Prudhvi, Gagan's brother
Jayaprakash as JP, Sweety's father
Shashank as Veerendra Varma, Narayana's son
Sravan as Arjun's brother
Vani Viswanath as Narayana's sister
Sithara as Narayana's wife
Chalapathi Rao as Satyam
G. V. Sudhakar Naidu as Inspector 
Dhanya Balakrishna as Sweety's friend
Ester Noronha as Manasa, Prudhvi's wife
Sivannarayana Naripeddi as Sivannarayana, Prudhvi's father-in-law
Bharani as Narayana's brother 
Prabhu as Lecturer
Amulya as Amulya
Chitti
Pragya Jaiswal as Falguni (extended cameo appearance)
Catherine Tresa in item number "A For Apple"

Soundtrack

The music was composed by Devi Sri Prasad. Music released on Junglee Music.

Production

Development
Bellamkonda Suresh selected director Boyapati Srinu to direct his son Bellamkonda Sreenivas' third film. It was confirmed by the director later when the script work was in its final stages. The film was officially launched at Annapurna Studios in Hyderabad on 27 August 2014. Devi Sri Prasad was declared as the music director, Arthur A. Wilson was declared as the cinematographer, A. S. Prakash was declared as the art director while the story and dialogues were written by M. Rathnam. The film was said to be on the lines of Boyapati Srinu's debut film Bhadra and the script work was complete by then. Nallamalupu Bujji was reported to replace Bellamkonda Suresh as the film's producer due to the latter's financial crisis. However, Sreenivas confirmed that his father would produce the film and it has been delayed due to story discussions but not due to financial problems.

Casting
Early reports said that Shruti Haasan would be selected as the female lead of the film. However, in a press meet, Bellamkonda Suresh said that the female lead is yet to be finalized and discussions are going on. Tamannaah was selected as the female lead who said that her role was well written, unique and something she never did in her earlier films. On the day of launch, Boyapati Srinu said that another heroine will act in a guest role. Reports in mid-October 2014 suggested that Tamannaah may opt out of the film as she has to accommodate dates for Baahubali and for a Tamil film. In early November 2014, it was known that Sreenivas is working on his body language and would sport a new look for the film.

Due to the halt in the project, the search for the female lady began in January 2016 and it was reported that makers are keen on signing Shruti Haasan or Rakul Preet Singh. Pragya Jaiswal was cast as the second female lead.

Filming

The makers planned to start the regular shooting in early November 2014. In early November 2016, the filming was announced to start in December 2016 once Sreenivas undergoes the transformation envisioned by Boyapati Srinu.

The principal photography began in mid-November 2016.

After a much delay of two years the shooting commenced in November 2016. It released on 11 August 2017.

The film was also dubbed into Hindi as Jaya Janaki Nayaka - Khoonkhar and premiered on Zee Cinema on 7 July 2018 and laterely dubbed in Malayalam as Njan Gagan And Premiered on Flowers TV and released on YouTube by Pen Movies channel, which has reached more than 630+ million views.

References

External links
 

2017 films
Indian action drama films
2010s masala films
Films scored by Devi Sri Prasad
Films directed by Boyapati Srinu
Indian films about revenge
Indian romantic action films
Films about Indian weddings
Films about mass murder
2010s Telugu-language films
Films about murder
2017 action drama films